Donna Daley-Clarke (born London) is a British novelist. Her book Lazy Eye won the 2006 Commonwealth Writers' Prize, Best First Book, Europe and South Asia.

She is a graduate of the University of East Anglia.

Awards
2000 Arts and Humanities Board Award
2001 Jerwood Young Writer's apprenticeship award
2004 Arts Council Award
2005 Hawthornden Castle fellowship

Works
A lazy eye, W.F. Howes, 2006, ; MacAdam/Cage, 23 March 2007,

References

External links
Articles by Donna Daley-Clarke, OpenDemocracy
"Daley-Clarke", BS1
"Daley-Clarke", Arvon foundation

English women novelists
Writers from London
Living people
Alumni of the University of East Anglia
Year of birth missing (living people)